The following are the national records in speed skating in Mongolia maintained by the Skating Union of Mongolia.

Men

Women

References

National records in speed skating
Records
Speed skating
Speed skating-related lists
speed skating